Neutron is a fictional character appearing in American comic books published by DC Comics. He is usually an adversary of Superman.

Publication history
Neutron first appeared in Action Comics #525 (November 1981) and was created by Marv Wolfman and Joe Staton.

Fictional character biography
Nathaniel Tryon was a petty thug who teamed up with two others as the TNT Trio.  While on a caper at a nuclear power plant at which he worked as a security guard, Tryon was caught in the meltdown of a nuclear reactor, turning his body into sentient nuclear energy that could only be contained in a special containment suit. After learning how to control his energy, and learning that the accident was allegedly caused and covered up by the U.S. Government, Tryon killed those responsible for the accident and took up a criminal career as Neutron.

Eventually, he battled Superman, and was defeated and imprisoned. He was later released by the manipulations of Abraxas Industries as part of an apparent work release program, when actually it was part of a propaganda campaign against Superman spearheaded by Vandal Savage. Neutron's part was to engage in seemingly random acts of destruction, when actually he had hired himself out as a deconstruction engineer, a fact which of course did not come out until after Superman had fought and arrested him. Vandal's schemes would later be revealed to the public, and Neutron was apparently arrested and re-imprisoned for his part in them.

He is next seen held at the research facility, S.T.A.R. Labs. He was eventually freed when S.T.A.R. Labs was attacked by mercenaries hired by the Fearsome Five. They took him and Jinx, whom they freed from Tri-State prison, into their ranks. Neutron subsequently left the group.

Neutron eventually joined Warp and Plasmus on a mission from Conduit to assassinate Jonathan and Martha Kent, the adoptive parents of Superman. Superman intervened and the clash ended with Plasmus and Neutron colliding in a blast that obliterated them both. Both later turned up alive, and Neutron was next seen in Slabside Island prison (aka "The Slab"), from which he was freed during the Joker’s "Last Laugh" riots. Recently, Neutron and several other villains were manipulated by Manchester Black into threatening Clark Kent’s loved ones, but as had happened before, the ensuing confrontation with Superman ended with Neutron disappearing in an atomic blast.

In Infinite Crisis, Neutron became a member of the Secret Society of Super Villains.

"One Year Later"

After the 2006 crossover miniseries Infinite Crisis, Neutron is working as a villain for hire. He and another radiation-powered villain, Radion, were hired by Intergang to kill Clark Kent. After Kent was hit by a commuter train, Neutron and Radion left, thinking him dead, though the accident actually caused Kent to regain his powers as Superman.

Neutron is also a member of the Nuclear Legion alongside Professor Radium, Geiger, Nuclear, Mister Nitro and Reactron. The Nuclear Legion was hired by the Secret Society of Super Villains to invade Blüdhaven and assist the Nuclear Family in recovering the source of a radiation leak. While there, the group fought the new Atomic Knights. Now sporting a new containment suit, Neutron was also seen fighting Superman in the pages of Superman #654, during a storyline in which Superman discovered that Intergang was planting mysterious energy spheres, about the size of softballs, in various locations in Metropolis. Although Superman has not yet determined the nature or purpose of the spheres, he discovered that they were connected to his adversary Bruno Mannheim, as well to other mysterious allies of Manheim who have yet to be revealed.

Neutron is one of the villains featured in Salvation Run. He is used by Lex Luthor as a power source for a teleporter. He is seemingly killed when the device self-destructs.

Powers and abilities
Neutron's body is composed of nuclear energy that grants him super strength, durability, nuclear blasts, flight at immense speed, transformation into pure energy, and radiation absorption.

In other media

Television
 Neutron makes non-speaking appearances in Justice League Unlimited as a member of Gorilla Grodd's Secret Society. Prior to and during the episode "Alive!", Lex Luthor takes control of the Society, but Grodd mounts a mutiny to retake command. Neutron sides with the latter, but is frozen by Killer Frost and killed off-screen by Darkseid along with Grodd's other loyalists.
 Neutron appears in the Smallville episode "Injustice", portrayed by Jae Lee. He joins Parasite, Livewire, and Plastique in forming a group to search for Davis Bloome, but is killed by the monster in the group's first encounter.
 Neutron appears in Young Justice, voiced by James Arnold Taylor. In the episode "Bloodlines", a future Neutron sends Impulse back in time to avert their post-apocalyptic, Reach-controlled future by saving the Flash. While Impulse succeeds in his mission and de-powering the present-day Neutron, the future version is horrified to discover that, other than his attire, his time did not change. As of the episode "Runaways", the present-day Neutron attends therapy with Black Canary and later becomes a counselor at the Metahuman Youth Center as of the third season.

Miscellaneous
Neutron appears in the audio drama, "Superman & The Neutron Nightmare".

References

External links
 Titans Tower: Neutron
 DCU Guide: Neutron

Characters created by Marv Wolfman
Comics characters introduced in 1981
DC Comics characters with superhuman strength
DC Comics metahumans
DC Comics supervillains
Fictional characters with nuclear or radiation abilities
Superman characters